The Sir John Monash Stakes is a Melbourne Racing Club Group 3 Thoroughbred horse race held under weight for age conditions, over a distance of 1100 metres at Caulfield Racecourse, Melbourne, Australia in July. Total prize money for the race is A$200,000.

History
The race is named after the Australian military commander during the First World War, Sir John Monash.

Name
1994–1997 - Moondah Stakes
1998 onwards - Sir John Monash Stakes

Distance
1994–2004 –  1000 metres
2005 onwards - 1100 metres

Grade
1994–2013 - Listed Race
2014 onwards - Group 3

Winners

 2022 - Mileva
2021 - Red Can Man
2020 - Jungle Edge
2019 - Oak Door
2018 - Voodoo Lad
2017 - Supido
2016 - Wild Rain
2015 - Miss Promiscuity
2014 - Lord of the Sky
2013 - Pago Rock
2012 - Platelet
2011 - Secret Flyer
2010 - Reward For Effort 
2009 - I Am Invincible 
2008 - Tesbury Jack 
2007 - Lucky Secret 
2006 - Sassbee 
2005 - Super Elegant 
2004 - Super Elegant 
2003 - Dantana
2002 - Rubitano
2001 - Regal Shot
2000 - Honour The Name
1999 - Flavour
1998 - Jugulator
1997 - Red Hope
1996 - Delsole
1995 - Royal Rubiton
1994 - Sequalo

See also
 List of Australian Group races
 Group races

References

Horse races in Australia
Open sprint category horse races
Caulfield Racecourse